A lemon squeezer is a kitchen utensil.

Lemon squeezer may also refer to:

Lemon squeezer (rock formation), a rock formation in New York state in the United States
Lemon squeezer (hat) a nickname for the New Zealand Army version of the  Stetson hat  
Lemon squeezer (revolver), a nickname for the Smith & Wesson Safety Hammerless